The Tihvinskaya water system was one of the waterways connecting the Volga River with the Baltic Sea, and specifically the Mologa River with Syas River. In terms of the current administrative division of Russia, the waterway belongs to Vologda and Leningrad Oblasts.

It was first conceived by Peter the Great, but construction started only in 1802. The Tihvinskaya water system was built for the passage of middle-sized ships. This Tikhvin system functioned until the middle of the 20th century, when shipping along the Svir River and the construction of railways had increased competition which led to its closure.

Geography 

The Tihvinskaya water system started at the Rybinsk wharf on the river Volga. The waterway went along the Volga (32 km), then on Mologa River (175 km). From the Mologa the waterway turned aside at Chagodoshcha and extended 179 km along the rivers Chagodoshcha and Gorun. After 33 km, it followed the river Sominka (32 km), lake Somin, and the Volchyna river (10 km).

Between the upper Volchyna river and Lake Elgino the 6 km Tikhvin canal was built. Then the path ran on lake Elgino, the Tikhvinka River (159 km), and on the river Says. Then the route goes through the Says canal (10 km), and Ladoga Canal, and finally through the Neva River (58 km). The Tihvinskaya system ends at the pier near the Alexander Nevsky Lavra in St. Petersburg. The Total length of the waterway was 902 km.

History 

In the 18th century, construction of the Tikhvinskaia water system was raised several times on the agenda, but each time it was delayed due to lack of money in the treasury. In the summer of 1797, because of the severe drought, ships could not pass through the Vyshny Volochyok Waterway. Again, the question arose about the construction of the Tikhvin system. On January 1, 1802 Alexander I approved a draft of the water system General Devolant that would have built 17 locks and 10 of the sluice, and the channel between the lakes and the Swan Krupin.

Current state 
Today, the Tihvinskaya water system has fallen into decline. All the gates are destroyed. The water level in Tikhvinka river fell more than 5 meters. Tikhvinka is heavily polluted with household waste. Numerous monuments of architecture, located on the banks of the Tikhvinka and its tributaries are in dilapidated condition.

References

Canals in Russia
Transport in Leningrad Oblast
Geography of Vologda Oblast
Cultural heritage monuments in Leningrad Oblast